Paolo Romani (born 18 September 1947) is an Italian politician, publisher, journalist and former minister of economic development.

Early life
Romani was born in Milan on 18 September 1947. He has a high school diploma.

Career
Romani worked as television executive in Italy. He joined Silvio Berlusconi's Forza Italia party in 1994. In 2008, he was elected to the Italian parliament and served as deputy minister of communications from 30 June 2009 to 4 October 2010.

Romani was appointed minister of the economic development to the fourth Berlusconi cabinet on 4 October 2010. He replaced Silvio Berlusconi as minister who had led the ministry since May 2010. Romani's term ended when he was replaced by Corrado Passera as minister on 16 November 2011.

References

External links

1947 births
Deputies of Legislature XII of Italy
Deputies of Legislature XIII of Italy
Deputies of Legislature XIV of Italy
Deputies of Legislature XV of Italy
Deputies of Legislature XVI of Italy
Living people
Politicians from Milan
Italian Liberal Party politicians
Forza Italia politicians
The People of Freedom politicians
Forza Italia (2013) politicians
Government ministers of Italy
Senators of Legislature XVII of Italy
Senators of Legislature XVIII of Italy
Italian publishers (people)
Journalists from Milan
Italian male journalists
20th-century Italian journalists